Cadiouclanis is a genus of moths in the family Sphingidae, containing only one species, Cadiouclanis bianchii, which is known from Ethiopia.

References

Endemic fauna of Ethiopia
Smerinthini
Monotypic moth genera
Insects of Ethiopia
Moths of Africa